Stien den Hollander (born 8 November 2000), known professionally as S10, is a Dutch singer, rapper and songwriter. She began her musical career in 2016, and was signed to the Dutch hip hop record label  in 2017. In 2019, she released her debut studio album Snowsniper, which went on to win an Edison Award. Den Hollander represented the Netherlands in the Eurovision Song Contest 2022 with the song "De diepte", the first Eurovision entry to be sung in the Dutch language since .

Early life and education 
Den Hollander and her twin brother were born on 8 November 2000 in Hoorn, North Holland. Since her birth, she has had little to no contact with her biological father. She grew up in nearby Abbekerk and later in Hoorn, where she attended secondary school. After completing the mavo curriculum in 2018, she has been studying at the Herman Brood Academie in Utrecht.

Throughout her teenage years, Den Hollander suffered from mental health issues, including experiencing auditory hallucinations and depression. When she was 14 years old, she was admitted to a psychiatric hospital following a suicide attempt.

Career 
In 2016, Den Hollander self-released her first mini-album Antipsychotica, which she recorded using her Apple headphones and uploaded to the online audio distribution platform SoundCloud. Shortly after the release, she was discovered by rapper Jiggy Djé, and signed with his record label  in 2017. One year later, she released a second mini-album, titled Lithium. In her songs, her struggle with mental illness is an important theme, with both mini-albums being named after types of psychiatric medication.

In 2019, her debut album Snowsniper was released. The title is a reference to the Finnish sniper Simo Häyhä, which Den Hollander explained in the media as being "about the cold-heartedness, the solitude" and that "in essence, a soldier strives for peace, just as I strive for peace with myself". The album was awarded an Edison Award in February 2020. In November of the same year, she released her second studio album Vlinders, which peaked at number 5 in the Dutch Album Top 100.

In 2021, Den Hollander scored a hit with the single "Adem je in", which she wrote together with Jacqueline Govaert. On 7 December 2021, it was announced that she had been selected by the Dutch broadcaster AVROTROS to represent the Netherlands in the Eurovision Song Contest 2022. Her entry "De diepte" was released on 3 March 2022 and is in Dutch, making it the Netherlands' first Eurovision entry to be sung in the language since 2010.

Discography

Studio albums

Extended plays and mini-albums

Singles

As lead artist

As featured artist

Non-single album appearances

Soundtrack album appearances

Awards and nominations

Notes

References 

2000 births
21st-century Dutch women singers
21st-century Dutch singers
Dutch hip hop musicians
Dutch rappers
Dutch singer-songwriters
Dutch-language singers
Emo rap musicians
Eurovision Song Contest entrants for the Netherlands
Eurovision Song Contest entrants of 2022
Living people
Musicians from North Holland
People from Hoorn
People from Noorder-Koggenland